Gideon Baah (born 1 October 1991) is a Ghanaian footballer who plays as a defender for FC Motown in the National Premier Soccer League.

Club career

Early career 
In 2007, Baah won a football reality show (MTN Soccer Academy) in his home country, Ghana. He received a number of prizes which included cash, car, trip to watch the 2010 FIFA World Cup, and two-week trial at Chelsea FC academy. Chelsea player and Ghanaian international Michael Essien stated that he was very happy with Baah's performance and urged the club to offer him a contract. Baah later returned to Ghana.

Asante Kotoko 
In March 2010, Baah sustained a broken shin in a Premier League match against Hearts of Oak at the Baba Yara Stadium. He underwent surgery at the Komfo Anokye Teaching Hospital (KATH) in Kumasi. In November 2010, he went to Scotland in order to receive assistance with his rehabilitation at Hearts of Midlothian. On 28 November 2011, Gideon rejoined Asante Kotoko. On 30 November, he played his first match after returning from his long injury layoff for the Asante Kotoko SC Reserves side. On 21 April 2012, Baah played his first league match against Mighty Jets helping Asante Kotoko to a 2–0 victory and scoring in the process. While with Kotoko, Baah captured two Ghana Premier League titles and one Super Cup.

FC Honka 
Baah started his spell for FC Honka in a form of a loan from Asante Kotoko FC of the Ghanaian Premier League. On Saturday 13 March 2013, Baah made his Veikkausliiga debut in a 2–0 away loss to 'Turun Palloseura. On 22 March he made his home debut at the Tapiolan Urheilupuisto against local rivals HJK Helsinki. Baah scored the winning goal on 25 March 2013 in a 0–1 victory over FC KooTeePee in the Suomen Cup to take his team through to the next round. Baah was chosen to the Veikkausliiga team of the Month for April, May, June and July. On 3 June 2013 Baah was acknowledged for his performance in the first round of the Veikkausliiga by being named by SuomiFutis website as one of the top 5 best players. He scored his first Veikkausliiga goal on 30 June 2013 against FF Jaro where he scored the opening goal in a 4–2 victory. Baah made his Europa League debut on 18 July 2013 in the 2013–14 UEFA Europa League second qualifying round where they lost 1–3 in the first leg to 2012–13 Ekstraklasa runners up Lech Poznań. On 24 July 2013, Baah signed a 2-year contract with FC Honka. At the end of the 2013 Veikkausliiga season, he was officially selected as the leagues defender of the year and rookie of the year.

Helsingin Jalkapalloklubi 

In February 2014 it was announced that Baah had signed a contract to join HJK Helsinki. Upon joining the club he helped HJK qualify for the Europa League group stages in 2014 with a 5-4 aggregate victory over SK Rapid Wien. On 6 November, Baah opened the scoring for HJK in a famous 2–1 victory over Italian side Torino. On the following match day of 27 November Baah once again opened the scoring for HJK in another 2–1 victory over Copenhagen.

New York Red Bulls 
On 9 February 2016, it was announced that Baah had signed for American Major League Soccer side, New York Red Bulls. To replace defender Matt Miazga who had recently been transferred to Chelsea F.C. Baah made his first appearance with the club in 2–0 defeat against Toronto FC on 6 March. Upon recovering from a Week 3 hamstring injury that sidelined him for 6 weeks; Baah was loaned to affiliate club New York Red Bulls II on 1 May. The same day, Baah played 45 minutes for the affiliate side in a 2–0 defeat against Charlotte Independence. He scored his first goal with the club on 21 May 2016 in a 7–0 win over NYCFC. Baah suffered a broken leg in a July match against Portland Timbers, sidelining him for the remainder of 2016.

Baah missed the entire 2017 season due to complications during his injury recovery, playing only a few matches late in the year with Red Bulls II.

Kairat-A
On 1 February 2018, Baah went on trial with Kazakhstan Premier League side FC Kairat.
On 4 April 2018, Kairat announced that Baah had signed for their second team Kairat-A. Baah left Kairat-A on 20 May 2018 by mutual consent having scored once for the club.

FC Honka 
On 3 January 2019 it was announced Baah would return to FC Honka.

Shakhter Karagandy
On 24 January 2020, Baah signed for Shakhter Karagandy.

On 14 February 2021, Baah signed a new one-year contract with Shakhter Karagandy.

FC Motown
Baah returned to the United States in 2022, joining FC Motown of the National Premier Soccer League.

International career 
In 2009, he received a call-up to Ghana U20 national team.

In October 2015, Baah received his first senior call up to the Ghana national team. He made his debut for Ghana in a 13 October friendly against Canada, coming into the match as a substitute in the 87th minute.

Career statistics

Club

International

Honours

Club
Asante Kotoko
Ghana Premier League (2): 2011–12, 2012–13
Ghana Super Cup: 2012

HJK Helsinki
Finnish Championship: 2014
Finnish Cup: 2014
Finnish League Cup: 2015
New York Red Bulls II

 USL Championship: 2016

Individual
Veikkausliiga Rookie of the Year: 2013 
Veikkausliiga Defender of the Year: 2013

References

External links 
 
 
 westafricanfootball.com
 veikkausliiga.com

1991 births
Living people
Footballers from Accra
Ghanaian footballers
Association football defenders
Ghana international footballers
Ghanaian expatriate footballers
Expatriate footballers in Finland
Expatriate soccer players in the United States
Expatriate footballers in Kazakhstan
Expatriate footballers in Belarus
Ghanaian expatriate sportspeople in Finland
Ghanaian expatriate sportspeople in the United States
Ghana Premier League players
Veikkausliiga players
Major League Soccer players
Belarusian Premier League players
Asante Kotoko S.C. players
FC Honka players
Helsingin Jalkapalloklubi players
New York Red Bulls II players
FC Kairat players
FC Gomel players
FC Shakhter Karagandy players
Sporting Saint Mirren F.C. players